The women's 50 kilometres walk  at the 2019 World Athletics Championships was held in Doha, Qatar, on 28 September 2019.

Records
Before the competition records were as follows:

Schedule
The event schedule, in local time (UTC+3), was as follows:

Results
The final was started at 23:30.

References

50 kilometres walk
Racewalking at the World Athletics Championships